Heena Kausar is an Indian actress who appeared in several Hindi language films in the 1970s. She is the widow of dreaded Indian gangster and underworld don Iqbal Mirchi.

Biography
Kausar is the daughter of filmmaker K. Asif, famous as the producer and director of the epic film Mughal E Azam, by his third wife, the actress Nigar Sultana, who played the role of Bahaar in that film.

Kausar wanted to become an actress like her mother. Her father had died in 1971, just as Kausar was beginning her career, and this was a serious blow to her career dreams. It is also a fact that her father had few real friends in the film industry, and many who disliked him. Kausar she had to struggle a lot to get a foothold in the film industry. She took up whatever work was available and tried to make the best of it. She appeared in minor roles in a number of forgettable films as listed below. However, she could not get heroine roles.

In 1991, Kausar chose to marry the dreaded Indian gangster and underworld figure Iqbal Mirchi, becoming his second wife. She gave up acting and moved abroad to live with Mirchi. Her two subsequent releases are carry-overs from previous years. The marriage was childless, and Mirchi died of natural causes in 2013. Kausar continues to reside in the United Kingdom after her husband's death.

Filmography

 Ghar Bazar (1998)
 Aakhri Sanghursh (1997)
 Mirza Ki Shaadi (1989)
 Waapsi (1986)
 Mazloom (1986)
 Raat Ke Baad (1986)
 Paanch Khiladi (1985)
 Vairi-Jatt (1985)
 Pet Pyaar Aur Paap (1984)
 Hum Do Hamare Do (1984)
 Bhemaa (1984)
 Aaj Ka M.L.A. Ram Avtar (1984)
 Wanted: Dead or Alive (1984)
 Sulagte Armaan (1984)
 Lalach (1983)
 Razia Sultan (1983)
 Ayaash (1982)
 Nikaah (1982)
 Teri Maang Sitaron Se Bhar Doon (1982)
 Dharam Kanta (1982)
 Chambal Ke Daku (1982)
 Ganga Maang Rahi Balidan (1981)
 Kaalia (1981)
 Jail Yatra (1981)
 Roohi (1981)
 Madine Ki Galian (1981)
 Choron Ki Baaraat (1980)
 Sister (1980)
 Main Tulsi Tere Aangan Ki (1978)
 Jagal Bhaag Hamar (1978)
 Aadalat (1977)
 Paapi (1977)
 Parvarish (1977)
 Kitne Paas Kitne Door (1976)
 Shahi Lutera (1976)
 Nagin (1976)
 Ladki Bholi Bhali (1976)
 Gupt Shastra (1975)
 Dost (1974)
 Call Girl (1974)
 Door Nahin Manzil (1973)
 Ek Naav Kinare Do (1973)
 Jeet (1972)
 Parivartan (1972)
 Wafaa (1972)
 Pakeezah (1972)
 Shahar Se Door (1972)
 Dost Aur Dushman (1971)

References

External links

Year of birth missing (living people)
Living people
20th-century Indian actresses
Indian film actresses
Actresses in Hindi cinema
Actresses from Mumbai